The former United States Customhouse (now the Custom House Maritime Museum) is a historic building at 25 Water Street in Newburyport, Massachusetts.

The Classical Revival-style building was constructed in 1834 and served a custom house until Newburyport declined in popularity as a major port.  The Newburyport Maritime Society, Inc. operates the Custom House Maritime Museum to showcase the maritime heritage of the Merrimack Valley. The building was added to the National Register of Historic Places in 1971.  It is also a contributing element to the Market Square Historic District (also listed in 1971), and the Newburyport Historic District (listed in 1984).

See also
National Register of Historic Places listings in Essex County, Massachusetts
List of maritime museums in the United States

References

External links
Custom House Maritime Museum

Government buildings on the National Register of Historic Places in Massachusetts
Custom houses in the United States
Buildings and structures in Newburyport, Massachusetts
Museums in Essex County, Massachusetts
Maritime museums in Massachusetts
National Register of Historic Places in Essex County, Massachusetts
Robert Mills buildings
Individually listed contributing properties to historic districts on the National Register in Massachusetts
Custom houses on the National Register of Historic Places